Cercidospora soror is a species of lichenicolous fungus in the genus Cercidospora but it has not been assigned to a family. It was discovered growing on Arthrorhaphis citrinella in Austria but has since then also been reported from Greenland, where it infects Arthrorhaphis alpina and Arthrorhaphis citrinella.

References

Dothideomycetes
Fungi described in 1995
Fungi of Austria
Fungi of Greenland
Lichenicolous fungi
Taxa named by Dagmar Triebel
Taxa named by Walter Obermayer